The 1989–90 NBA season was the second season of the Miami Heat in the National Basketball Association (NBA). In the 1989 NBA draft, the Heat selected Glen Rice from the University of Michigan with the fourth overall pick, and selected Sherman Douglas out of Syracuse University with the 28th overall pick in the second round. The Heat moved from the Midwest Division of the Western Conference, where they played during the team's inaugural season, to the Atlantic Division of the Eastern Conference. The Heat looked to fix their scoring woes via the draft, but still suffered the pains of an expansion team, posting long losing streaks throughout the entire season. However, they finished fifth in the Atlantic Division with a 3-win improvement from 1988–89 with an 18–64 record. 

Second-year center Rony Seikaly led the team averaging 16.6 points per game, and was named the 1989–90 NBA Most Improved Player. Despite the awful season, the Heat would only receive the ninth overall pick in the Draft Lottery.

Draft picks

Roster

Regular season

Season standings

z – clinched division title
y – clinched division title
x – clinched playoff spot

Record vs. opponents

Player statistics

See also
 1989-90 NBA season

References

Miami Heat seasons
Miami Heat
Miami Heat
Miami Heat